Hans Christian Hagedorn (6 March 1888 – 6 October 1971) was the creator of NPH insulin and the founder of Nordisk Insulinlaboratorium, which is known today as Novo Nordisk.

Biography
Hagedorn and August Krogh (1874–1949) obtained the rights for insulin from Banting and Best in Toronto. 
In 1923 they formed Nordisk Insulinlaboratorium, and in 1926 with August Krogh he obtained a Danish Royal Charter as a non-profit foundation.

In the 1930s he became interested in modifying the absorption rate of insulin.  He was aware that contaminating proteins slowed the absorption of insulin into the bloodstream, but these caused irritation and side effects.  Thus he searched for a protein that would not cause any irritation.  He came upon protamine, a protein isolated from fish sperm.  Hagedorn discovered that the addition of protamine to insulin caused the insulin to form microscopic clumps.  These clumps took longer to dissolve into the bloodstream.   This complex of protamine and insulin is known as NPH (neutral protamine Hagedorn) insulin. It is one of  the earliest example of engineering drug delivery.

References

1888 births
1971 deaths
Danish pharmacologists